The 2010 Sarasota Open was a professional tennis tournament played on outdoor green clay courts. It was part of the 2010 ATP Challenger Tour. It took place in Longboat Key, Florida, United States between May 10 and May 16, 2010.

Singles main draw entrants

Seeds

 Rankings are as of May 3, 2010.

Other entrants
The following players received wildcards into the singles main draw:
  Sekou Bangoura
  Vamsee Chappidi
  Bobby Reynolds
  Michael Venus

The following players received entry from the qualifying draw:
  Daniel Garza
  Dayne Kelly
  Michael Ryderstedt
  Matt Reid

The following players received the lucky loser spots:
  Nicholas Monroe
  Bruno Rodríguez

The following players received special exempt into the main draw:
  Kei Nishikori
  Joseph Sirianni

Champions

Singles

 Kei Nishikori def.  Brian Dabul, 2–6, 6–3, 6–4

Doubles

 Brian Battistone /  Ryler DeHeart def.  Gero Kretschmer /  Alex Satschko, 5–7, 7–6(4), [10–8]

External links
Official website
ITF search 

Sarasota Open
Sarasota Open
2010 in American tennis
2010 in sports in Florida